Virginia City Historic District may refer to:

Virginia City Historic District (Virginia City, Montana), listed on the NRHP in Montana
Virginia City Historic District (Virginia City, Nevada), listed on the NRHP in Nevada